This is a list of cities and airports that Volaris serves as of July 2022:

Destinations

References

Volaris Flight Tickets

Lists of airline destinations